Partita for keyboard No. 4 in D Major, BWV 828, is a keyboard suite by Johann Sebastian Bach, originally dated 1728. It is the fourth suite in his Clavier-Übung I.

Structure
This partita consists of seven movements all in D major.

Notes

References

External links
 

Suites by Johann Sebastian Bach
Compositions for harpsichord

1728 compositions